Namche Bazaar (also Namche Bazar, Nemche Bazaar or Namche Baza) is a town (formally Namche Village Development Committee) in Khumbu Pasanglhamu Rural Municipality in Solukhumbu District of Province No. 1 of north-eastern Nepal. Most Sherpa who are in the tourism business are from the Namche area. Namche is the main trading center and hub for the Khumbu region.

At the time of the 2001 Nepal census, it had a population of 1,647 people living in 397 individual households.

Geography 

Transport 
On a hill overlooking Namche Bazaar is the Syangboche Airport (3,750 m / 12,303 ft). It is no longer used for passenger flights, though Russian helicopters make occasional cargo flights. The nearest open airport is Tenzing–Hillary Airport, located 13 km south of the town.

Tourism 
Namche Bazaar is popular with trekkers in the Khumbu region, especially for altitude acclimatization, and is the gateway to the high Himalaya. The town has a number of lodgings and stores catering to the needs of visitors as well as a number of internet cafés. There are German bakeries, little cafes and many restaurants. There is also an Irish pub, said to be the highest and most remote Irish pub in the world. A popular local meal is yak steak.

On Saturday mornings, a weekly market is held in the centre of the village. There may also be a daily Tibet market where clothing and cheap Chinese consumer goods tend to be the main articles for sale.

Namche has electricity from the nearby Thame-Namche hydropower plant (600 kW), opened in October 1995 near Thame.

Climate
Namche has either a relatively cold dry-winter subtropical highland climate (Köppen climate classification Cwb) or an unusually mild dry-winter warm-summer humid continental climate (Köppen climate classification Dwb), depending on if you use the  isotherm or the  isotherm. The city features pleasant, wet summers and chilly, dry winters mainly affected by its altitude and the summer monsoon season.

Pop culture references
"Namche Bazaar" is the name of a song by Nathan Rogers on his album The Gauntlet. The song was inspired by the mixing of culture along the silk road.

References

External links

Shrine at Namche Bazar

Populated places in Solukhumbu District
Tourism in Nepal
Bazaars in Nepal
Hill stations in Nepal
Tourist attractions in Nepal
Khumbu Pasanglhamu